This is a list of settlements in the island of Samos, Greece.

 Agioi Theodoroi
 Agios Konstantinos
 Ampelos
 Chora
 Drakaioi
 Kallithea
 Karlovasi
 Kastania
 Kokkari
 Kontaiika
 Kontakaiika
 Kosmadaioi
 Koumaiika
 Koumaradaioi
 Leka
 Manolates
 Marathokampos
 Mavratzaioi
 Mesogeio
 Myloi
 Mytilinioi
 Neochori
 Pagondas
 Palaiokastro
 Pandroso
 Platanos
 Pyrgos
 Pythagoreio
 Samos
 Skouraiika
 Spatharaioi
 Stavrinides
 Vathy
 Vourliotes
 Ydroussa

See also
List of towns and villages in Greece

 
Samos